Knittel is a family name in German speaking countries:

Anna Stainer-Knittel (1841–1915) an Austrian painter, also known as Geierwally
Benedikt Knittel a monk and poet of the 17th century
Franz Anton Knittel Lutheran orthodox theologian
Gustav Knittel a German officer and convicted war criminal
John Knittel a German-English-Swiss novelist

Knittel may also refer to:
 Knittelvers

Occupational surnames